The Southern Rhodesia Volunteers was a army regiment active from 1898 to 1920 during the time of the British South Africa Company's rule over Rhodesia.

History 
In 1898, the Southern Rhodesia Volunteers was established as a mounted corps supported by cyclists, signallers, and engineers. The Southern Rhodesia Volunteers served alongside the British South Africa Police and various Colonial and British Units.

The Southern Rhodesia Volunteers had two divisions, the Eastern Division based in Salisbury and the Western Division based in Bulawayo.

The Southern Rhodesia Volunteers served in the Boer War and the Siege of Mafeking. After their service in both deployments, they were their first King’s Colour and Regimental Colour. The Southern Rhodesia Volunteers never participated in the First World War, as their territory was represented on the front line by the Rhodesia Regiment.

See also 
Rhodesia
Northern Rhodesia

References 

1890 establishments in Southern Rhodesia
1890s in Southern Rhodesia
1900s in Southern Rhodesia
1910s in Southern Rhodesia
1920s in Southern Rhodesia
Rhodesia
History of Zimbabwe